Emma Caroline Smith-Stanley (1805 – 26 April 1876) was the Countess of Derby as the wife of Edward Smith-Stanley, 14th Earl of Derby, who served as Prime Minister of the United Kingdom three times in the mid-19th century.

The second daughter of Edward Bootle-Wilbraham, 1st Baron Skelmersdale, she married Edward Smith-Stanley in May 1825. They had three children:
Edward Henry Stanley, 15th Earl of Derby, eldest son
Frederick Arthur Stanley, 16th Earl of Derby, second son, one of Canada's Governors-General and the man after whom the Stanley Cup is named.
 Lady Emma Charlotte Stanley, only daughter (died 23 August 1928), married Wellington Patrick Manvers Chetwynd Talbot, son of Charles Chetwynd-Talbot, 2nd Earl Talbot.

Arms

References

External links
 

1805 births
1876 deaths
Spouses of prime ministers of the United Kingdom
English countesses
Daughters of barons
Emma
Women of the Victorian era
Wives of knights